Daniel Robert Marie Camiade (9 April 1940 – 12 April 2020) was a French rugby league and rugby union player, who played at the scrum-half position.

Biography
Camiade joined USA Perpignan at a young age. The club made it to the final of the Challenge Yves du Manoir in 1956 against FC Lourdes. He then joined US Quillan, winning a Rugby Pro D2 championship in 1964. He then switched to rugby league with the Saint-Estève XIII Mavericks, winning a French Rugby League Championship in 1971 and the Lord Derby Cup in 1972. He played one game for the French national team in 1971, scoring 8 points. After his playing career, Camiade coached for the Limoux Grizzlies and US Quillan.

References

1940 births
2020 deaths
French rugby league players
French rugby union players
Rugby union scrum-halves
France national rugby league team players